The Piaggio P.150 was a 1950s Italian two-seat trainer designed and built by Piaggio to meet an Italian Air Force requirement to replace the North American T-6.

Development
The P.150 was designed and built to compete as an Italian Air Force T-6 replacement against the Fiat G.49 and Macchi MB.323. The P.150 was an all-metal low-wing cantilever monoplane with a wide-track retractable tailwheel landing gear. The pilot and instructor were seated in tandem under one glazed canopy. It was originally powered by a Pratt & Whitney Wasp radial engine and later an Alvis Leonides engine. The aircraft was not chosen and did not go into production.

Operators

Italian Air Force  operated only one aircraft for test evaluation from 1952 until 1954

Specifications (P.150)

See also

References

 
 The Illustrated Encyclopedia of Aircraft (Part Work 1982-1985), 1985, Orbis Publishing, Page 2714

P.150
1950s Italian military trainer aircraft
Single-engined tractor aircraft
Low-wing aircraft
Aircraft first flown in 1952